Maksym Kovalyov (born 20 March 1989) is a Ukrainian professional footballer who plays as a defender for Inhulets Petrove.

Career
He is product of FC Stal Alchevsk and FC Shakhtar Donetsk academy systems. His first trainer was Vyacheslav Frantsev.

References

External links
 

1989 births
Living people
People from Alchevsk
Ukrainian footballers
FC Shakhtar Donetsk players
FC Shakhtar-2 Donetsk players
FC Shakhtar-3 Donetsk players
FC Zorya Luhansk players
FC Mariupol players
Ukrainian Premier League players
Association football defenders
FC Stal Alchevsk players
FC Zirka Kropyvnytskyi players
FC Inhulets Petrove players
Ukrainian First League players
Ukraine youth international footballers
Sportspeople from Luhansk Oblast